Diospyros plectosepala is a tree in the family Ebenaceae. The specific epithet  is from the Greek meaning "twisted sepal". Its habitat is forests from sea-level to  altitude. D. plectosepala is endemic to Borneo and known only from Sarawak.

References

plectosepala
Endemic flora of Borneo
Trees of Borneo
Flora of Sarawak
Plants described in 1873